Upchurch is an album by jazz and R&B guitarist Phil Upchurch recorded in 1969 and released on the Cadet label.

Reception

Allmusic awarded the album 2 stars.

Track listing 
All compositions by Phil Upchurch except as indicated
 "Black Gold" (Charles Stepney) – 4:31  
 "America" (Paul Simon) – 3:30  
 "As You Said" (Jack Bruce, Pete Brown) – 2:31  
 "You Wouldn't, You Couldn't Be True" – 3:02  
 "Crosstown Traffic" (Jimi Hendrix) – 4:00  
 "Adam and Charlene" (Charles Stepney) – 4:19  
 "Spinning Wheel" (David Clayton-Thomas) – 3:28  
 "Voodoo Chile" (Jimi Hendrix) – 2:52  
 "More and More" (Don Juan Mancha, Vee Pea Smith) – 2:43  
 "Midnight Chile" – 4:09

Personnel 
Phil Upchurch – guitar
Donny Hathaway – piano
Louis Satterfield – bass 
Morris Jennings – drums
Bobby Christian – percussion
James Mack Singers - vocals
Charles Stepney – arranger and conductor

References 

Phil Upchurch albums
1969 albums
Cadet Records albums
Albums produced by Charles Stepney
Albums arranged by Charles Stepney
Instrumental albums